Presidential elections were held in Poland on February 5, 1947, the last presidential elections until 1989. The president had to be elected by the newly formed Legislative Sejm among presented candidates. However, the only standing figure was Bolesław Bierut. Opposition Polish People's Party voted against.

Results

References

President
Presidential elections in Poland
Poland